Trillium is a genus of flowering plants. It may also refer to:

 Trillium Brewing Company, an American brewery
 Trillium CNG, a subsidiary of WEC Energy Group
 Trillium Corporation, the former name of Telarium, a publisher of adventure games in the 1980s
 Trillium Cup, an annual two-team cup rivalry between Major League Soccer's Toronto FC and the Columbus Crew
 Trillium Digital Systems, a software company providing portable communications software products
 Trillium Model, a software engineering model for telecommunications systems
 Trillium (Buckeye), a planned community in Buckeye, Arizona, US
 Trillium (series), a series of fantasy novels by Andre Norton, Marion Zimmer Bradley and Julian May
 Trillium (Vertigo), an 8-issue comic series by Jeff Lemire
 Trillium Software, a suite of software products from Harte Hanks
 Telereal Trillium a British property company
 Trillium, a heavy metal band founded and fronted by Amanda Somerville
 Trillium, imprint of Ohio State University Press

Canada 
The white trillium (Trillium grandiflorum) has been Ontario's official floral emblem since 1937.

 Trillium Book Award, a literature prize sponsored by the Government of Ontario
 Trillium Gift of Life Network, government agency regulating organ donation in Ontario
 Trillium Health Partners, a group of three hospitals serving Mississauga and western Toronto
 Trillium Line, a Diesel-powered light-rail line in Ottawa
 Trillium Park, a provincial park in Toronto
 Trillium Party of Ontario, a social conservative political party in Ontario
 Trillium Railway, a Canadian short-line railway operating in the Niagara Region of Ontario

Ships
 , passenger ferry on Lake Ontario
 , Royal Canadian Navy vessel
  - class of bulk carriers owned by Canada Steamship Lines

See also 
 Trillian (disambiguation)
 Trillion (disambiguation)